Actinoplagia is a genus of flies in the family Tachinidae, containing a single species, Actinoplagia koehleri.

Distribution
Argentina, Chile, Uruguay.

References

Diptera of South America
Dexiinae
Tachinidae genera
Taxa named by Émile Blanchard
Monotypic Brachycera genera